Igor Lozo (born 2 March 1984) is a Croatian football player playing for NK Međimurje. He previously played for Chornomorets Odessa.

References

External links
 
Igor Lozo at the Croatian Football Federation website

1984 births
Living people
Footballers from Split, Croatia
Association football defenders
Croatian footballers
Croatia under-21 international footballers
HNK Hajduk Split players
HNK Šibenik players
NK Mosor players
NK Istra players
FC Chornomorets Odesa players
NK Junak Sinj players
NK Međimurje players
NK Imotski players
Gol Gohar players
NK Dugopolje players
Croatian Football League players
First Football League (Croatia) players
Ukrainian Premier League players
Croatian expatriate footballers
Expatriate footballers in Ukraine
Croatian expatriate sportspeople in Ukraine
Expatriate footballers in Iran
Croatian expatriate sportspeople in Iran